The 11th Parliament of Antigua and Barbuda was elected on 9 March 1999.

Members

Senate

House of Representatives

References 

Parliaments of Antigua and Barbuda